The 2008–09 Nizam-Druid Welsh National League was the sixty-fourth season of the Welsh National League (Wrexham Area). The league was reduced to two divisions for senior teams this season, the remaining two divisions were made into reserves and colts leagues. The Premier Division was won by Llangollen Town, who gained promotion to the Cymru Alliance.

Premier Division

League table

Division One

League table

External links
Welsh National League

2008-09 Premier Division
3